Jonathan David Ordway (born October 19, 1978]) is a former Arena football defensive back. He was a member of the Tampa Bay Storm, Ottawa Renegades, Chicago Rush and Montreal Alouettes in the Canadian Football League.  Ordway attended Boston College.

Ordway was named All-County and All-Conference as a senior running back at Armwood High School in Seffner, Florida.

External links
Montreal Alouettes bio

1978 births
Living people
People from Seffner, Florida
American football defensive backs
Boston College Eagles football players
American players of Canadian football
Canadian football defensive backs
Ottawa Renegades players
Tampa Bay Storm players
Chicago Rush players
Montreal Alouettes players
Sportspeople from Hillsborough County, Florida
Players of American football from Florida